Emmerson may refer to:

Places
 Emmerson Island, Nunavut, Canada

People

Given name
 Emmerson Bockarie, Sierra Leonian pop singer
 Emmerson Boyce (born 1979), English-born professional footballer (soccer player) who represents Barbados internationally
 Emmerson Mnangagwa (born 1942), Zimbabwean politician
 Emmerson Nogueira (born 1972), Brazilian guitarist and songwriter
 Emmerson Trotman (born 1954), West Indies cricketer

Surname
 Archie Aldis Emmerson (born 1929), American landowner
 Ben Emmerson, KC (born 1963), English barrister
 Bill Emmerson (born 1945), American politician in California
 Craig Emmerson (born 1971 or 1974), English-born rugby union player
 George Emmerson (1906–1966), English professional footballer (soccer player)
 Henry Emmerson (1853–1914), Canadian lawyer, businessman, politician, and philanthropist, the father of Henry Read Emmerson
 Henry Read Emmerson (1883–1954), Canadian business executive, salesman, and politician, the son of Henry Emmerson
 Henry Hetherington Emmerson (1831–1895), English artist
 Les Emmerson (1944–2021), Canadian vocalist and guitarist
 Louis Lincoln Emmerson (1863–1941), American politician, Governor of Illinois from 1929 to 1933
 Ralph Emmerson (1913–2007), English clergyman
 Scott Emmerson (born 1982), English professional footballer
 Simon Emmerson, British record producer, guitarist, and disc jockey
 Simon Emmerson (composer), (born 1950), electroacoustic music composer

See also
Emerson (disambiguation)
Emery (name)